The Shire of Irwin is a local government area in the Mid West region of Western Australia, about  south of Geraldton and about  north of the state capital, Perth.

History
The Irwin Road District was created on 24 January 1871 as one of the first regional local government areas in Western Australia. Before this, it was the "Victoria District". In 16 June 1916, Irwin received a large land area from the Upper Irwin Road Board shortly before that entity's dissolution. Sections of the district separated as part of the formation of the Carnamah Road District on 24 August 1923 and the Three Springs Road District on 2 November 1928.

On 1 July 1961, it became a shire following the passage of the Local Government Act 1960, which reformed all remaining road districts into shires.

In June 2015, Irwin declared itself gasfield free.

Population

Wards
The Shire is divided into four wards:

 Denison Ward (four councillors)
 North Ward (two councillors)
 South East Ward (two councillors)
 Town Ward (two councillors)

Towns and localities
The towns and localities of the Shire of Irwin with population and size figures based on the most recent Australian census:

Notable councillors
 Samuel James Phillips, Irwin Road Board member 1883; later a state MP
 Charles Maley, Upper Irwin Road Board member 1907–1929; also a state MP

Heritage-listed places

As of 2023, 157 places are heritage-listed in the Shire of Irwin, of which 16 are on the State Register of Heritage Places.

References

External links
 

 
Irwin